Norman Arthur Routledge (7 March 1928 – 27 April 2013) was a British mathematician and schoolteacher. He was a personal friend of fellow mathematician Alan Turing (1912–1954).

Life and career
Norman Routledge was born near Alexandra Park, north London, England. He was about to begin secondary education at Glendale County School, Wood Green, in 1939, when the outbreak of World War II intervened. He was evacuated with his mother, going to live in Letchworth with an aunt, and attending Letchworth Grammar School, where he was taught mathematics by George Braithwaite.

In 1946 Routledge matriculated at King's College, Cambridge with a scholarship, where he read mathematics. He was supervised by Albert Ingham and Philip Hall. He gained a first class degree in 1949 and went on to research in recursion theory. It resulted in the papers Ordinal recursion (1953) and Concerning definable sets (1954).

Routledge taught as a scientific officer at the Royal Aircraft Establishment, RAE Farnborough. He went on to the National Physical Laboratory (NPL), Teddington. These were placements to fulfil the requirements for his compulsory national service. At the NPL in 1952 he was able to become an operator of an early version of the Automatic Computing Engine: the Pilot ACE project supported by Harry Huskey's prototype assembler.

Returning to academia, Routledge became a research Fellow in mathematics at King's College, Cambridge. He did college undergraduate teaching, and after a time was a director of studies. In 1957, he was photographed by Antony Barrington Brown. The photograph is now in the collection of the National Portrait Gallery, London.

In 1959, Robert Birley, Headmaster at Eton College, asked Routledge for a recommendation of some promising student for a mathematics teaching post; and he suggested himself. He taught mathematics at the school for some years and was later a housemaster. He was considered an inspirational teacher, teaching among other Etonians Timothy Gowers and Stephen Wolfram. Later in his life, he taught music for the Salvation Army community in Bermondsey, southeast London.

Routledge was a raconteur, including on his personal life. In retirement towards the end of his own life, he was able to be more openly gay.

Association with Alan Turing
Routledge was a friend of the mathematician and codebreaker Alan Turing, whom he met after World War II, when Turing was in Cambridge to study physiology. Turing wrote personal letters to Routledge towards the end of his life. After his arrest and before his trial, he sent the following cryptic syllogism to Routledge in 1952:

The 1992 documentary programme The Strange Life and Death of Dr Turing had Routledge as one of the interviewees.

Selected publications

References

Bibliography

External links
 Norman Routledge (Teacher), Web of Stories – Life Stories of Remarkable People, YouTube
 Norman Routledge, Saucy Raconteur, Remembers His Friend Alan Turing, Nassau Hedron, The Turing Centenary (+ Bicentennial), 18 October 2011

1928 births
2013 deaths
People from the London Borough of Haringey
20th-century English mathematicians
Alumni of King's College, Cambridge
Scientists of the National Physical Laboratory (United Kingdom)
Fellows of King's College, Cambridge
Teachers at Eton College
Gay academics
Alan Turing